Jeffrey Dale Branson (born March 10, 1977) is an American actor. He is known for his role as Ronan Malloy on The Young and the Restless, Jonathan Lavery on All My Children, and Shayne Lewis on Guiding Light.

Career

Branson originated the role of Jonathan Lavery on the ABC soap opera All My Children on June 15, 2004. Although he was off the air from mid-April until August 2005 while his character was believed dead in an explosion, Branson remained on contract the entire time. Branson's last appearance on All My Children aired on December 18, 2007.

Branson's work prior to All My Children included a 2000 guest spot on NBC's Law & Order: Special Victims Unit. He had a small part that year in the film Shaft and in 2002 he was in the feature film Wolves of Wall Street.

In 2004, he played the role of a younger Alan Spaulding on Guiding Light; he also played Shayne Lewis on Guiding Light up until the last episode of the show on September 18, 2009.

In 2005, Branson received a Daytime Emmy Award nomination in the category of Outstanding Supporting Actor in a Drama Series for his work on All My Children as Jonathan Lavery. In 2009, he received his second Daytime Emmy Award nomination for his portrayal of Shayne Lewis on Guiding Light. He won this award, tied with Vincent Irizarry from All My Children.

In June 2010, Branson began work on The Young and the Restless in the role of Ronan Malloy. Malloy is Nina Webster's long-lost son that was stolen as a baby and put up for adoption. He plays an undercover FBI agent on a mission to bust corrupt cops in Genoa City involved in a drug ring. He left the show from February to August 2011. On June 26, 2012, he arrived back in Genoa City because of Victor Newman. In 2012, Branson won the Dankies Award for outstanding supporting actor for his role as Malloy.

Branson played the character of "Johnny" in the 2010 film I Spit on Your Grave, a remake of the 1978 revenge film.

His television appearances outside of daytime drama include episodes of NCIS, NCIS: Los Angeles, The Mentalist, Law & Order: SVU, and Supernatural. He also appeared in the first season of Supergirl as Master Jailer.

Branson appears as Neil Armstrong in the Apple TV+ series For All Mankind.

Filmography

Film

Television

References

External links

Official website

1977 births
Living people
American male film actors
American male soap opera actors
American male television actors
Daytime Emmy Award winners
Daytime Emmy Award for Outstanding Supporting Actor in a Drama Series winners
Male actors from St. Louis